Interpreter of Maladies is a book collection of nine short stories by American author of Indian origin Jhumpa Lahiri published in 1999. It won the Pulitzer Prize for Fiction and the Hemingway Foundation/PEN Award in the year 2000 and has sold over 15 million copies worldwide.  It was also chosen as The New Yorker'''s Best Debut of the Year and is on Oprah Winfrey's Top Ten Book List.

The stories are about the lives of Indians and Indian Americans who are caught between their roots and the "New World".

Contents

Plot summary

A Temporary Matter
A married couple, Shukumar and Shoba, live as strangers in their house until an electrical outage brings them together when all of sudden "they [are] able to talk to each other again" in the four nights of darkness. From the point of view of Shukumar, we are given bits and pieces of memory which slowly gives insight into what has caused the distance in the marriage. For a brief moment, it seems the distance is nothing but perhaps a result of a disagreement. However, descriptions of Shukumar and Shoba's changed physical appearances begin to hint at something much more than a lovers’ quarrel. We soon find out that both characters’ worn outward appearance results from their internal, emotional strife that has caused such deeply woven alienation from each other.

The husband and wife mourn for their stillborn baby. This traumatic loss casts a tone of melancholia for the rest of the story. However, there is some hope for the couple to reconnect as during each night of blackness, they confess more and more to each other—the things that were never uttered as man and woman. A late night drink with a friend, a ripped out photo from a magazine, and anguish over a sweater vest are all confessions made in the nightly blackouts. Shukumar and Shoba become closer as the secrets combine into a knowledge that seems like the remedy to mend the enormous loss they share together. On the fourth night, we are given the most hope at their reconnection when they "make love with a desperation they had forgotten."

But just as to be stillborn is to have never begun life, so too does the couple's effort to rekindle their marriage fail at inception. One last confession is given first by Shoba, then another by Shukumar at the end of "A Temporary Matter". In full confidence with one another, they acknowledge the finality in the loss of their marriage. And finally, "They weep for the things they now knew."

When Mr. Pirzada Came to Dine

Mr. Pirzada is a botany professor from Dhaka and is living in New England for the year after receiving a research grant from the Pakistani Government; he has left behind his wife and seven daughters, who he has not contacted in months. Because his grant does not provide him much for daily provisions, he routinely visits ten-year-old Lilia and her family for dinner, often bringing confectionery for the young girl. When Lilia mistakenly refers to Mr. Pirzada as "Indian" to her parents in private, her father tells her that he is Pakistani, which is puzzling to Lilia because he looks like her parents, eats the same things, and speaks Bengali like them. However, the constant television news of the East Pakistan-West Pakistan War informs her about Mr. Pirzada's differences as well as his current plight. Because of this, she decides one night to eat the candy he gives her, pray, and forgo brushing her teeth so that the magic of the candy through prayer will remain. She also tries her best to learn as much about Pakistan as possible from her school library. Her curiosity is stunted by her teacher telling her there is "no reason to consult" the book on Pakistan.

During late October, her mother buys a large pumpkin, which Lilia insists she carves. Mr. Pirzada offers his help and ends up doing most of the cutting. When news of a potential war between India and West Pakistan over East Pakistan is reported, the knife slips from Mr. Pirzada's hand and forms an "O" as the jack-o-lantern's mouth. During Halloween, when Lilia and her friend Dora go trick-or-treating dressed as witches, Mr. Pirzada insists that he accompany them for safety purposes; Lilia responds, "don't worry" and soon realizes the irony of her statement. Mr. Pirzada responds, "if the lady insists" and stays with Lilia's parents for the night.

During Lilia and Dora's stroll around the neighborhood, Dora asks why Mr. Pirzada wanted to accompany them so direly. Lilia remarks that "his daughters are missing," which causes her great guilt upon saying it. Lilia then tries to justify to Dora that she misspoke a moment ago and that Mr. Pirzada's daughters are actually fine. That night, upon returning home, she learns of the imminent India-Pakistan War and when it occurs in December, their home is deprived of joy. After the new year, Mr. Pirzada returns home to a new nation, Bangladesh. Soon after when he sends pictures of him and all his daughters, Lilia and her family are relieved. Lilia reveals that she has been eating a piece of Halloween candy and praying for him everyday, but when she received the good news, stopped doing so and eventually decided to throw away the candy.

Interpreter of Maladies

Mr. and Mrs. Das, Indian Americans visiting the country of their heritage, hire a middle-aged tour guide Mr. Kapasi as their driver for the day as they tour. Mr. Kapasi notes the parents’ immaturity. Mr. and Mrs. Das look and act young to the point of childishness, go by their first names when talking to their children, Ronny, Bobby, and Tina, and seem selfishly indifferent to the kids. On their trip, when her husband and children get out of the car to sightsee, Mrs. Das sits in the car, eating snacks she offers to no one else, wearing her sunglasses as a barrier, and painting her nails. When Tina asks her to paint her nails as well, Mrs. Das just turns away and rebuffs her daughter.

Mr. and Mrs. Das asks the good-natured Mr. Kapasi about his job as a tour guide, and he tells them about his weekday job as an interpreter in a doctor's office.  Mr. Kapasi's wife resents her husband's job because he works at the doctor's clinic that previously failed to cure their son of typhoid fever. She belittles his job, and he, too, discounts the importance of his occupation as a waste of his linguistic skills. However, Mrs. Das deems it “romantic” and a big responsibility, pointing out that the health of the patients depends upon Mr. Kapasi's correct interpretation of their maladies.

Mr. Kapasi begins to develop a romantic interest in Mrs. Das and conducts a private conversation with her during the trip. Mr. Kapasi imagines a future correspondence with Mrs. Das, picturing them building a relationship to translate the transcontinental gap between them. However, Mrs. Das reveals a secret: she tells Mr. Kapasi the story of an affair she once had, and that her son Bobby had been born out of her adultery. She explains that she chose to tell Mr. Kapasi because of his profession; she hopes he can interpret her feelings and make her feel better as he does for his patients, translating without passing judgment. However, when Mr. Kapasi reveals his disappointment in her and points out her guilt, Mrs. Das storms off.

As Mrs. Das walks away towards her family, she leaves a trail of crumbs of puffed rice snacks, and monkeys begin to trail her. The neglectful Das parents don't notice as the monkeys, following Mrs. Das's food trail, surround their son, Bobby, isolating the son born of a different father. The monkeys begin to attack Bobby, and Mr. Kapasi rushes in to save him. Mr. Kapasi returns Bobby to his parents and looks on as they clean up their son.

A Real Durwan

Boori Ma is a feeble 64-year-old woman deported to Calcutta who is the stairsweeper, or durwan, of an old brick building. In exchange for her services, the residents allow Boori Ma to sleep in front of the collapsible gates leading into the tenement. While sweeping, she narrates stories of her past: her daughter's extravagant wedding, her servants, her estate and her riches. The residents of the brick building hear continuous contradictions in Boori's storytelling, but her stories are seductive and compelling, so they let her contradictions rest.  One family in particular takes a liking to Boori Ma, the Dalals. Mrs. Dalal often gives Boori Ma food and takes care of her ailments. When Mr. Dalal gets promoted at work, he improves the brick building by installing a sink in the stairwell and a sink in his home. The Dalals continue to improve their home and even go away on a trip to Simla for ten days and promise to bring Boori Ma a sheep's hair blanket. While the Dalals are away, the other residents become obsessed with making their own improvement to the building. Boori Ma even spends her life savings on special treats while circling around the neighborhood. However, while Boori Ma is out one afternoon, the sink in the stairwell is stolen. The residents accuse Boori Ma of informing the robbers and in negligence for her job. When Boori Ma protests, the residents continue to accuse her because of all her previous inconsistent stories. The residents' obsession with materializing the building dimmed their focus on the remaining members of their community, like Boori Ma. The short story concludes as the residents throw out Boori Ma's belongings and begin a search for a 'real durwan'. Note that 'durwan' means housekeeper in both Bengali and Hindi.

Sexy

“Sexy” centers on Miranda, a young white woman who has an affair with a married Indian man named Dev. Although one of Miranda's work friends is an Indian woman named Laxmi, Miranda knows very little about India and its culture. The first time she meets Dev, she is not able to discern his ethnicity. However, she is instantly captivated by his charm and the thrill of being with an exotic, older man. Dev takes Miranda to the Mapparium, where he whispers "You're sexy." Miranda buys "sexy" clothes that she thinks are suitable for a mistress, but feels pangs of guilt because Dev is married. Meanwhile, Laxmi's cousin has been abandoned by her husband, who left the cousin for a younger woman. One day, Laxmi's cousin comes to Boston and Miranda is asked to babysit the cousin's seven-year-old son, Rohin. Rohin asks Miranda to try on the sexy clothes that she bought, and gives Miranda insight into his mother's grief. Miranda decides that she and Dev's wife both "deserve better," and stops seeing Dev.

Mrs. Sen's

In this story, 11-year-old Eliot begins staying with Mrs. Sen—a university professor's wife—after school.  The caretaker, Mrs. Sen, chops and prepares food as she tells Eliot stories of her past life in Calcutta, helping to craft her identity.  Like "A Temporary Matter," this story is filled with lists of produce, catalogs of ingredients, and descriptions of recipes.  Emphasis is placed on ingredients and the act of preparation. Other objects are emphasized as well, such as Mrs. Sen's colorful collection of saris from her native India.  Much of the plot revolves around Mrs. Sen's tradition of purchasing fish from a local seafood market.  This fish reminds Mrs. Sen of her home and holds great significance for her.  However, reaching the seafood market requires driving, a skill that Mrs. Sen has not learned and resists learning.  At the end of the story, Mrs. Sen attempts to drive to the market without her husband, and ends up in an automobile accident.  Eliot soon stops staying with Mrs. Sen thereafter.

This Blessed House

Sanjeev and Twinkle, a newly married couple, are exploring their new house in Hartford, Connecticut, which appears to have been owned by fervent Christians. As they go about investigating and fixing up the house, they begin to find small Christian knickknacks, left behind by the previous owners. Twinkle first finds a porcelain effigy of Christ. Sanjeev does not like it and tells Twinkle to get rid of it, but she thinks it is pretty and might even be worth something. Sanjeev reminds her that they are not Christians. No, she confirms, they are Hindus. She puts the statue of Christ on the fireplace mantel. The story ends when, during a party, Twinkle and the guests explore the house. Upon searching the attic, they find a solid silver bust of Christ. Meanwhile, Sanjeev, who stayed downstairs, alone, contemplates his situation and relationship with Twinkle.

The Treatment of Bibi Haldar
29-year-old Bibi Haldar is gripped by a mysterious ailment, and myriad tests and treatments have failed to cure her. She has been told to stand on her head, shun garlic, drink egg yolks in milk, to gain weight and to lose weight. The fits that could strike at any moment keep her confined to the home of her dismissive elder cousin and his wife, who provide her only meals, a room, and a length of cotton to replenish her wardrobe each year. Bibi keeps the inventory of her brother's cosmetics stall and is watched over by the women of their community. She sweeps the store, wondering loudly why she was cursed to this fate, to be alone and jealous of the wives and mothers around her. The women come to the conclusion that she wants a man. When they show her artifacts from their weddings, Bibi proclaims what her own wedding will look like. Bibi is inconsolable at the prospect of never getting married. The women try to calm her by wrapping her in shawls, washing her face or buying her new blouses. After a particularly violent fit, her cousin Haldar emerges to take her to the polyclinic. A remedy is prescribed—marriage: “Relations will calm her blood.” Bibi is delighted by this news and begins to plan and plot the wedding and to prepare herself physically and mentally. But Haldar and his wife dismiss this possibility. She is nearly 30, the wife says, and unskilled in the ways of being a woman: her studies ceased prematurely, she is not allowed to watch TV, she has not been told how to pin a sari or how to prepare meals. The women don't understand why, then, this reluctance to marry her off if she such a burden to Haldar and his wife. The wife ask who will pay for the wedding?

One morning, wearing a donated sari, Bibi demands that Haldar take her to be photographed so her image can be circulated among the bachelors, like other brides-in-waiting. Haldar refuses. He says she is a bane for business, a liability and a loss. In retaliation, Bibi stops calculating the inventory for the shop and circulates gossip about Haldar's wife. To quiet her down, Haldar places an ad in the paper proclaiming the availability of an “unstable” bride. No family would take the risk. Still, the women try to prepare her for her wifely duties. After two months of no suitors, Haldar and his wife feel vindicated. Things were not so bad when Bibi's father was alive. He created charts of her fits and wrote to doctors abroad to try to cure her. He also distributed information to the members of the village so they were aware of her condition. But now only the women can look after her while being thankful, in private, that she is not their responsibility.

When Haldar's wife gets pregnant, Bibi is kept away from her for fear of infecting the child. Her plates are not washed with the others, and she is given separate towels and soap. Bibi suffers another attack on the banks of the fish pond, convulsing for nearly two minutes. The husbands of the village escort her home in order to find her rest, a compress, and a sedative tablet. But Haldar and his wife do not let her in. That night, Bibi sleeps in the storage room. After a difficult birth, Haldar's wife delivers a girl. Bibi sleeps in the basement and is not allowed direct contact with the girl. She suffers more unchecked fits. The women voice their concerns but it goes unheeded. They take their business elsewhere and the cosmetics in the stall soon expire on their shelves. In autumn, Haldar's daughter becomes ill. Bibi is blamed. Bibi moves back into the storeroom and stops socializing—and stops searching for a husband. By the end of the year, Haldar is driven out of business, and he packs his family up and moves away. He leaves Bibi behind with only a thin envelope of cash.

There is no more news of them and a letter written to Bibi's only other known relative is returned by the postal service. The women spruce up the storeroom and send their children to play on their roof in order to alert others in the event of an attack. At night, however, Bibi is left alone. Haggard, she circles the parapet but never leaves the roof. In spring, vomit is discovered by the cistern and the women find Bibi, pregnant. The women search for traces of assault, but Bibi's storeroom is tidy. She refuses to tell the women who the father is, only saying that she can't remember what happened. A ledger with men's names lay open near her cot. The women help her carry her son to term and teach her how to care for the baby. She takes Haldar's old creams and wares out of the basement and reopens his shop. The women spread the word and soon the stall is providing enough money for Bibi to raise her boy. For years, the women try to sniff out who had disgraced Bibi but to no avail. The one fact they could agree upon is that Bibi seemed to be cured.

The Third and Final Continent
In "The Third and Final Continent", the narrator lives in India, then moves to London, then finally to America. The title of this story tells us that the narrator has lived in three different continents and chooses to stay in the third, North America. As soon as the narrator arrives, he decides to stay at the YMCA. After saving some money he decides he wants to move somewhere a little more like a home. He responds to an advertisement in the paper and ends up boarding with an elderly woman. At first, he is very respectful and courteous to the elderly woman. The narrator does not feel that he owes the old woman anything and does not go out of his way for her.

But his attitude changes once he discovers that the elderly woman is one hundred and three years old. He becomes more caring and is amazed that this old woman has lived for one hundred and three years. Because of this woman's age, she is not accustomed to the modern times in which this story takes place. The narrator, just like the elderly woman, is not accustomed to the times in America, but also to America in general. This may help the narrator to feel more comfortable in his new setting. After boarding with the elderly woman for about six weeks, the narrator grows somewhat attached to this woman.

Once his wife, who he was set up beforehand to marry, arrives in America he then decides to move to a bigger home. Upon this decision, he also realizes that he is going to have to look out for and nurture his new wife. After living with his wife for a time and learning to know her, he soon finds out that the elderly woman he had once lived with is now dead. This hurts him because this is the first person in America for whom he had felt any feelings. After the woman's death, he then becomes more comfortable with his wife, not because the woman died but because of the time he is spending with his wife. Just like his relationship with the elderly woman, the more time he spends with a person the closer he becomes to them. After some time, the narrator falls in love with his wife, and is frequently remembering the elderly woman with whom he had once resided.

 Critical reception Interpreter of Maladies garnered universal acclaim from myriad publications. Michiko Kakutani of the New York Times praises Lahiri for her writing style, citing her "uncommon elegance and poise." Time applauded the collection for "illuminating the full meaning of brief relationships—with lovers, family friends, those met in travel". Ronny Noor asserts, "The value of these stories—although some of them are loosely constructed— lies in fact that they transcend confined borders of immigrant experience to embrace larger age-old issues that are, in the words of Ralph Waldo Emerson, 'cast into the mould of these new times' redefining America."

Noelle Brada-Williams notes that Indian-American literature is under-represented and that Lahiri deliberately tries to give a diverse view of Indian Americans so as not to brand the group as a whole. She also argues that Interpreter of Maladies is not just a collection of random short stories that have common components, but a "short story cycle" in which the themes and motifs are intentionally connected to produce a cumulative effect on the reader: "...a deeper look reveals the intricate use of pattern and motif to bind the stories together, including recurring themes of the barriers to and opportunities for human communication; community, including marital, extra-marital, and parent-child relationships; and the dichotomy of care and neglect."

Ketu H. Katrak reads Interpreter of Maladies as reflecting the trauma of self-transformation through immigration, which can result in a series of broken identities that form "multiple anchorages." Lahiri's stories show the diasporic struggle to keep hold of culture as characters create new lives in foreign cultures. Relationships, language, rituals, and religion all help these characters maintain their culture in new surroundings even as they build a "hybrid realization" as Asian Americans.

Laura Anh Williams observes the stories as highlighting the frequently omitted female diasporic subject. Through the foods they eat, and the ways they prepare and eat them, the women in these stories utilize foodways to construct their own unique racialized subjectivity and to engender agency. Williams notes the ability of food in literature to function autobiographically, and in fact, Interpreter of Maladies indeed reflects Lahiri's own family experiences. Lahiri recalls that for her mother, cooking "was her jurisdiction. It was also her secret." For individuals such as Lahiri's' mother, cooking constructs a sense of identity, interrelationship, and home that is simultaneously communal and yet also highly personal.Jhumpa Lahiri, "Cooking Lessons: The Long Way Home." The New Yorker 6 Sept. 2004: 83-84.

TranslationInterpreter of Maladies'' has been translated into many languages:

Notes and references

External links
Review at Library Thing
 Photos of the first edition of Interpreter of Maladies

American short story collections
2000 short story collections
Indian-American literature
Pulitzer Prize for Fiction-winning works
Asian-American short story collections
Short story collections by Jhumpa Lahiri
Houghton Mifflin books
Indian diaspora in fiction
Hemingway Foundation/PEN Award-winning works
Indian-American culture